Ann Rosamund Oakley (née Titmuss; born 17 January 1944) is a British sociologist, feminist, and writer. She is professor and founder-director of the Social Science Research Unit at the UCL Institute of Education of the University College London, and in 2005 partially retired from full-time academic work to concentrate on her writing, especially on new novels.

Biography
Oakley is the only daughter of Professor Richard Titmuss and wrote a biography of her parents as well as editing some of his works for recent re-publication. Her mother Kathleen, née Miller, was a social worker.

Ann Oakley was born in London in 1944. She was educated at Haberdashers' Aske's School for Girls and Somerville College, Oxford University taking her Bachelor of Arts in 1965, having married fellow future academic Robin Oakley the previous year. In the next few years Oakley wrote scripts for children's television, wrote numerous short stories and had two novels rejected by publishers. Returning to formal education at Bedford College, University of London, she gained a PhD in 1969; the qualification was a study of women's attitudes to housework, from which several of her early books were ultimately derived. Much of her sociological research focused on medical sociology and women's health. She has also made important contributions to debates about sociological research methods.

In 1985, Oakley moved to work at the Institute of Education in London where she set up the Social Science Research Unit (SSRU).

Ann Oakley has written numerous academic works, many focusing on the lives and roles of women in society as well as several best-selling novels, of which the best-known is probably The Men's Room, which was adapted by Laura Lamson for BBC television in 1991, and which starred Harriet Walter and Bill Nighy. She has also written an early partial autobiography. She divides her life between living in London and in a rural house where she does most of her fiction writing. She is a mother and grandmother. Her daughter, Dr Emily Caston, is course director of Film and Television at the London College of Communication, University of the Arts London, a governor of Film London, formerly a producer of music videos (including for U2, Madonna, and Portishead) and television commercials- and author of Celluloid Saviours- Angels and Reform Politics in Hollywood Film (2020).

Publications

Non-fiction 

 
 
 
  (also translated into German, Dutch and Japanese).
  (Re-titled version of Housewife – 1974)
 
 
Reprinted as:

Fiction 
 
  (televised)

Journal articles

References

External links 

The Social Science Research Unit at the Institute of Education of the University College London
Ann Oakley at "Pioneers of Qualitative Research" from the Economic and Social Data Service

1944 births
British feminists
British sociologists
Medical sociologists
English women novelists
Academics of the UCL Institute of Education
Alumni of Bedford College, London
Alumni of Somerville College, Oxford
Living people
Fellows of Somerville College, Oxford
People educated at Haberdashers' Girls' School